Tylothais savignyi is a species of sea snail, a marine gastropod mollusk, in the family Muricidae, the murex snails or rock snails.

Distribution
This species occurs in the Red Sea.

References

External links
 Deshayes, G. P. & Milne-Edwards, H. (1844). Histoire naturelle des animaux sans vertèbres, présentant les caractères généraux et particuliers de ces animaux, leur distribution, leurs classes, leurs familles, leurs genres, et la citation des principales espèces qui s'y rapportent, par J. B. P. A. de Lamarck. Deuxième édition, Tome dixième. Histoire des Mollusques. J. B. Baillière: Paris. 638 pp.

savignyi
Gastropods described in 1844